Mildred Claire Pratt (18 March 1921 – 5 April 1995) was a Canadian artist, poet and editor who published her work as Claire Pratt.

Biography
Pratt was born in Toronto, Ontario on March 18, 1921, the only daughter of Viola Whitney, an editor of the magazine World Friends, and poet E. J. Pratt.

Pratt contracted polio at the age of 4 and later developed osteomyelitis, an inflammatory disease of the bone. This affected her for most of her life.

She received degrees in English and Philosophy from Victoria College, University of Toronto, with a gold medal. She then studied international relations at Columbia University, and art at the Boston Museum of Fine Art among other schools. She went on to become an editor for Macmillan Canada, the University of Toronto Press, and Harvard University Press, and senior editor at McClelland & Stewart from 1956-1965. She retired due to her health issues in 1964, although continued to freelance for various publishing houses. She continued her art studies in Toronto and Massachusetts. She published Silent Ancestors in 1971. This genealogical essay is a tribute to the descendants of the Pratt family, originally from Yorkshire, who settled in Newfoundland.

Pratt's art consisted largely of woodcuts, and there were exhibitions of her graphic art across North America and in Europe. Her interest in Japanese graphics stimulated an interest in haiku. Her work in this style was widely published, often with her own illustrations. Her work was also inspired by her father's poetry, and she use excerpts from his poems in many of her Christmas cards. She also explored the themes and imagery of E. J. Pratt's work in various works.

References

External links

The Mildred Claire Pratt fonds at the Victoria University Library at the University of Toronto that consists of records associated with Claire Pratt's career as writer and artist, in addition to family records.
Institute of Arts and Humanities page on Claire Pratt

1921 births
1995 deaths
20th-century Canadian poets
University of Toronto alumni
Canadian book editors
Canadian women poets
20th-century Canadian printmakers
Canadian graphic designers
English-language haiku poets
Canadian women essayists
20th-century Canadian women writers
20th-century Canadian essayists
20th-century Canadian women artists
Women graphic designers
Canadian expatriates in the United States